The Ministry of Justice of Yugoslavia refers to the justice ministry which was responsible for judicial system of the Kingdom of Yugoslavia from 1918 to 1941 and the communist SFR Yugoslavia from 1945 to 1992. It may also refer to the justice ministry of Serbia and Montenegro (officially named the Federal Republic of Yugoslavia) from 1992 to 2003.

List of ministers

Kingdom of Yugoslavia (1918–1941)

Yugoslav government-in-exile (1941–1945)

SFR Yugoslavia (1945–1992)

FR Yugoslavia (1992–2003)

See also
Ministry of Justice (Serbia)
Ministry of Justice (Croatia)
Ministry of Justice (Montenegro)

External links
List of ministers at Rulers.org
Governments of the Kingdom of the Serbs, Croats & Slovenes (Yugoslavia) 1918–1945

Government of Yugoslavia
Yugoslavia